Stephen Aiello (born April 30, 1983) is an American songwriter, musician, and record producer. He is best known for touring and recording with American rock band Thirty Seconds to Mars. He was one of the founding members of Monty Are I, a band he formed in 1998 with some friends. Aiello has also worked with artists such as Mumford & Sons, Cheyenne Jackson, Lana Del Rey, Junkie XL, Young Guns, Cobra Starship, Every Avenue, Starset, and The Knocks, among others.

Aiello was nominated for two GMA Dove Awards for his work with Rapture Ruckus on the album Invader (2015). His list of work includes projects with recording acts like Sleeping with Sirens, Of Mice & Men, We Came as Romans, Anti-Flag, Blessthefall, Pop Evil, and Before Their Eyes.

Early life
Stevie Aiello was born April 30, 1983, in Cranston, Rhode Island. His family has Italian origins; his great-grandparents moved from Serrastretta to United States in the early 20th-century. Aiello attended the Cranston High School West and then enrolled at the University of Rhode Island in Kingston. While he was a student there, he started writing music and playing in a number of rock and metal bands. His influences include artists as varied as Underoath, Metallica, Josh Groban, Hans Zimmer, and Michael Jackson.

Music career

Aiello founded Monty Are I in 1998 with guitarist Ryan Muir, keyboardist Andrew Borstein, bassist Mike Matarese, and drummer Justin Muir. Aiello was the lead singer of the band and played rhythm guitar. After winning Ernie Ball's Battle of the Bands in 2003, Monty Are I signed to Stolen Transmission, an imprint of Island Records.

Monty Are I went on to play Warped Tour and shared the stage with bands like Anberlin, My Chemical Romance, Taking Back Sunday, Yellowcard, Hawthorne Heights and The Red Jumpsuit Apparatus. Aiello recorded the albums Wall of People (2006) and Break Through the Silence (2009) as frontman and composer of Monty Are I. He later joined music publishing company Razor & Tie as songwriter and record producer. During this period, he worked with Ben Lovett from Mumford & Sons, Cheyenne Jackson, Lana Del Rey, Junkie XL, Alex Suarez from Cobra Starship, Every Avenue, and The Knocks.

Aiello collaborated with Before Their Eyes on the albums Untouchable (2010) and Redemption (2012) alongside producer Joey Sturgis. In early 2013, He moved to Los Angeles where he started working with Thirty Seconds to Mars after former touring member Tim Kelleher left the band to work on his own music. Aiello is playing bass guitar, keyboards and occasionally rhythm guitar. He later began to take part at recording sessions with the band. In 2014, Aiello joined producer Rob Graves to work with Starset on the album Transmissions (2014), and again in 2019 for Starset's third studio album, Divisions.

He worked with Crown the Empire on the albums The Resistance: Rise of the Runaways (2014) and Retrograde (2016). His work with Rapture Ruckus on their fifth album Invader (2015) earned him two nominations at the GMA Dove Awards in the categories of Rock/Contemporary Album of the Year and  Rap/Hip Hop Song of the Year. Aiello rejoined Joey Sturgis to work with Blessthefall on their fifth album To Those Left Behind (2015). He later worked on the records Echoes (2016) by Young Guns and Gossip (2017) by Sleeping with Sirens.

In 2018 he started a side project called CNTRLLR and on 19 October of the same year he released a new version of "Stuck" by The Aces on Spotify and YouTube. On April 26, 2019 he released a new song called "Endgame".

Discography

References

External links

 
 

1983 births
American male songwriters
American people of Italian descent
Guitarists from Rhode Island
Living people
People from Cranston, Rhode Island
Record producers from Rhode Island
Songwriters from Rhode Island
University of Rhode Island alumni
People from Rhode Island
American male bass guitarists
21st-century American bass guitarists
21st-century American male musicians
20th-century American bass guitarists
American rock bass guitarists
American rock keyboardists
20th-century American male musicians